Restauration is French for restoration.

Restauration can refer to:
Portuguese Restoration War (1640–1668)
European Restoration, the return of many monarchies after Napoleon's French were defeated.
Bourbon Restoration, the restoration of the French monarchy under Louis XVIII.
Restauration (Switzerland), the period from 1814 to 1830 in Switzerland.
Restauration (ship), one of the first ships bearing Norwegian immigrants to the United States.

See also
Restoration (disambiguation)